Susan Jean Hekman (born February 28, 1949), is a postmodern feminist and the professor of political science and director of the graduate humanities program at the University of Texas at Arlington (UTA). Hekman's research has been critical of standpoint feminist theory.

Biography 
Hekman was born in Grand Rapids, Michigan, USA, in 1949. Hekman earned her Ph.D from the University of Washington in Seattle. While Hekman stayed at NIAS, she completed the first chapter of her proposed book, Subject Matters: The Evolution of the Subject in Feminist Theory. Hekman stated that, "the book will be an analysis of the major contributions to the development of the subject in feminist theory from the mid-twentieth century to the present. The first chapter, an analysis of the path-breaking work of Simone de Beauvoir, defines the themes that will be pursued in subsequent chapter. After completing this chapter, I sketched out the outline of the entire book, mapping the organization of the chapters and the theses that I will develop."

Selected works

Books

Journal articles 
 
See also:

References

External links 
 Profile page: Susan Hekman, University of Texas at Arlington

1949 births
Carleton College alumni
Feminist studies scholars
Feminist theory
Living people
Postmodernists
University of Texas at Arlington faculty
University of Washington alumni
American women political scientists
American political scientists